Olathe South High School is a public high school located in Olathe, Kansas, United States, serving students in grades 9-12. The school is one of five high schools in the Olathe USD 233 school district. Olathe South High School was recognized as a National School of Excellence for the 1990–91 school year by the U.S. Department of Education, becoming the first high school in Olathe to do so. Olathe South's official colors are blue and gold, and the official mascot is the Falcon. The average annual enrollment at Olathe South is approximately 2,100 students.

Olathe South High School was established in 1981 in order to help educate the rapidly increasing population of Olathe. In 2009, construction began on remodeling the school in order to accommodate ninth graders for the first time.

Olathe South is a member of the Kansas State High School Activities Association and offers a variety of sports programs. Athletic teams compete in the 6A division and are known as the "Falcons". Extracurricular activities are also offered in the form of performing arts, school publications, and clubs.

History
Built in 1981, Olathe South became the second high school in the Olathe public school system. In 1990, the school was awarded Blue Ribbon status. In 2002, a black box theater was added to the school. In June 2009, construction began on remodeling the school in order to accommodate ninth graders for the first time.

Campus
The most notable feature of Olathe South is that it is entirely on one level. The campus is situated near the intersection of 151st and Ridgeview Roads in southern Olathe.

Adjacent to the Olathe South building on the west side of the campus is Indian Trail Middle School. Towards the northern end rests Heritage Elementary. The eastern side of the campus is the track, practice football, marching band, and soccer fields.

Academics

In 1990, Olathe South High School was selected as a Blue Ribbon School. The Blue Ribbon Award recognizes public and private schools which perform at high levels or have made significant academic improvements.

On Mondays, Tuesdays and Fridays, school begins at 8:00 and ends at 3:00, features seven class hours of 48 minutes, and one 50-minute lunch break known as "Falcon 50." Odd Blocks, on Wednesdays, feature four class hours (1st, 3rd, 5th and 7th), each about 90 minutes long, with seven lunch breaks. Seminar Blocks, on Thursdays, feature the collaboration (7:30-8:10), three class hours (2nd, 4th and 6th) and the seminar, each about 90 minutes long.

AP courses
Olathe South has AP courses in Biology, Calculus AB, Calculus BC, Chemistry, English Language and Composition, English Literature and Composition, Environmental Science, European History, French 5, Government & Politics (U.S.), Music Theory, Psychology, Spanish 5, Statistics, Studio Art and U.S. History.

Professional Careers Academy
The Professional Careers Academy (PCA) goals are to teach students leadership skills and ethics and prepare students for life after high school. The PCA also brings in guest speakers in a program called the "PCA Lecture Series". This has brought in such speakers as ethics professor Marianne Jennings, local judge Janice Russell, ex-district attorney Paul Morrison, and many more. PCA assists students in finding internships in their prospective field for their senior year of high school as well as teach career-building skills, such as writing resumes.

CSA
The Computer Science Academy (CSA) program provides students with the computer programming and cyber security skills they need for their future endeavors in the computer market.

Extracurricular activities

Athletics
The Falcons compete in the Sunflower League and are classified as a 6A school, the largest classification in Kansas according to the Kansas State High School Activities Association. Throughout its history, Olathe South has won sixteen state championships in various sports.  The Olathe South Athletic Program promotes education and discipline through athletics.

State championships

Eco-Club
Ecology Club (Eco-Club) is derived from the Student Naturalist class, which raises awareness about things students can do to protect the environment. As well as improving the greening up of the campus.

Instrumental music

Band
The marching element of the band is called the Olathe South Falcon Regiment (pictured right). During concert season, OSHS has two bands, Symphonic Band and Wind Ensemble. The Falcon Jazz Ensemble performed for the 2004 Kansas Music Educators Inservice Workshop. The Falcon Spirit Pep Band, a volunteer group, plays for basketball games, Spirit Riots (pep rallies) and other school events.

Orchestra
The orchestra is made up of an Advanced orchestra, a Concert orchestra and a group for both sophomores and freshmen. They play a selection of classical, baroque, chamber, and contemporary music, including scores from popular movies. Every fall, the orchestra performs with all the other Olathe high school orchestras, giving them a chance to play with new people and stretch their performing skills. They have gone to clinics taught by notable people, including American composer Soon Hee Newbold and former Trans-Siberian Orchestra member Mark Wood (violinist). Every spring, they compete in the State Large-group Orchestra Competition.

Publications
The Eyrie
The Eyrie is a student-written publication that publishes 12 issues a year. The Eyrie annually competes in the Kansas Scholastic Press Association (KSPA) journalism competition, hosted at the University of Kansas. Some members of The Eyrie are also part of Quill and Scroll, a journalism honor society. The paper is named after the nest of the falcon, an "eyrie." Along with creating videos and podcasts, The Eyrie also publishes online versions of the paper.

Talon
The Talon is the name of the annual yearbook. OSHS yearbook is actually given out at the start of every year at enrollment, so that activities and athletics past the spring page deadlines could be included.

Theatre
The Olathe South Theatre Department presents multiple main stage shows a year. Olathe South, troupe #5006, is a member of the International Thespian Society. The theatre department has taken 5 shows to the International Thespian Festival. Their production of 13 won the KC Starlight Blue Star Award for Outstanding Overall Show in 2013.  The troupe received the Outstanding School Award from Educational Theatre Association in 2013. Three students from South have competed at the ESU National Shakespeare Competition in Lincoln Center.  Olathe South Theatre students have won many scholarships and awards in theatre.

S.A.S.H.
Students Achieving Social Harmony (S.A.S.H.) is an activity where students are given semester issues dealing with anything from socioeconomics to religion. The club has done charitable work such as decorating Children's Mercy Kansas City as well as hosting a Toys for Tots fundraiser.

STUCO
The Student Council (STuCO) is a four-person elected body: President, Vice-President, Secretary, and Treasurer, as well as 4 sets of 4 class officers of the same names. There is also an elected body representing all four grades called the General Assembly, or GA.

Math Team
Olathe South has a competitive math team that goes to many competitions throughout the year. It is coached by John Hail. They have participated in every Olathe Math Battle since it was started in 2009, and have won it 6 of the 7 times.

Notable alumni
 Sally Buzbee, Executive Editor of the Washington Post
 Don Davis, former linebacker for the New England Patriots
 Rob Pope, member of the prototypical indie rock band, The Get Up Kids
 Ryan Pope, member of the prototypical indie rock band, The Get Up Kids
Braden Smith, offensive guard for the Indianapolis Colts.
 Jim Suptic, member of the prototypical indie rock band, The Get Up Kids

See also
 List of high schools in Kansas
 List of unified school districts in Kansas
Other high schools in Olathe USD 233 school district
 Olathe East High School in Olathe
 Olathe North High School in Olathe
 Olathe Northwest High School in Olathe
 Olathe West High School in Olathe
Olathe South feeder schools
 Frontier Trail Middle School
 Indian Trail Middle School
 Chisholm Trail Middle School

References

External links
 
 Olathe USD 233 School District

Educational institutions established in 1981
1981 establishments in Kansas
Public high schools in Kansas
Education in Olathe, Kansas
Schools in Johnson County, Kansas
Buildings and structures in Olathe, Kansas